Countdown to Armageddon may be:

 Countdown to Armageddon (2004 film), a 2004 History (American TV channel) documentary film
 Countdown to Armageddon, a 1998 documentary film by Madacy Records
 Countdown to Armageddon, a Decoding the Past episode
 Countdown to Armageddon, a 1987 DC Heroes role playing game adventure featuring Superman.
 "Countdown to Armageddon", the opening track from the album It Takes a Nation of Millions to Hold Us Back by Public Enemy.